Wars is the third album from American hardcore group XBXRX, released in April 2007 on Polyvinyl Records.

Track listing
All songs by XBXRX.
"Centre Where Sight" – 4:06
"Freezing Water" – 2:06
"Sheets and Organs" – 2:09
"Here to Ruin the Party" – 2:19
"Eighth War" – 2:21
"Suffocation" – 1:14
"Minds" – 2:25
"Sons of Horn" – 1:21
"In Veins" – 2:17
"Towers of Silence" – 3:14
"Day Eleven" – 1:31
"Ear Ever Hear" – 2:16

References

2007 albums
XBXRX albums
Polyvinyl Record Co. albums